The Primetime Emmy Award for Outstanding Costumes for a Series is a retired award that was presented as part of the Primetime Emmy Awards. In 2015, this category and Outstanding Costumes for a Miniseries, Movie, or Special were rearranged as Outstanding Costumes for a Period/Fantasy Series, Limited Series, or Movie and Outstanding Costumes for a Contemporary Series, Limited Series, or Movie.

Winners and nominations

1960s
Outstanding Individual Achievement in the Visual Arts

1970s
Outstanding Achievement in Costume Design

Outstanding Achievement in Costume Design for a Drama or Comedy Series

1980s

1990s

2000s

2010s

Designers with multiple awards

3 awards
 Joan Bergin
 Robert Blackman

2 awards
 Susan O'Connor Cave
 Michele Clapton
 L. Paul Dafelmair 
 Jean-Pierre Dorleac
 Peggy Farrell
 Alexander Fordham
 Chic Gennarelli
 Shelly Levine
 Bob Mackie
 Patrick R. Norris
 Jessica O'Leary
 Lyn Paolo 
 Loree Parral 
 Gabriella Pescucci
 Uliva Pizzetti
 Melina Root

Programs with multiple wins

3 wins
 Star Trek: The Next Generation
 The Tudors

2 wins
 The Borgias
 Fame
 Game of Thrones
 Homefront
 JAG
 Picket Fences
 thirtysomething

Programs with multiple nominations

6 nominations
 L.A. Law
 The Nanny
 Star Trek: The Next Generation

5 nominations
 China Beach
 Mad Men
 Murder, She Wrote
 Sex and the City
 thirtysomething

4 nominations
 Boardwalk Empire
 Designing Women
 Desperate Housewives
 Dynasty
 Game of Thrones
 Picket Fences
 Quantum Leap
 Remember WENN
 The Sopranos
 Star Trek: Voyager
 That '70s Show
 The Tudors

3 nominations
 Alias
 Beauty and the Beast
 The Borgias
 Deadwood
 Downton Abbey
 Dr. Quinn, Medicine Woman
 JAG
 Mama's Family
 Married... with Children
 Moonlighting
 Murphy Brown
 Once Upon a Time
 Road to Avonlea
 Six Feet Under
 Ugly Betty

2 nominations
 Ally McBeal
 Amazing Stories
 Carnivàle
 Cybill
 Dallas
 Fame
 Fantasy Island
 Glee
 Homefront
 I'll Fly Away
 The Magnificent Seven
 NewsRadio
 Night Court
 Pushing Daisies
 Rome
 Scarecrow and Mrs. King
 Star Trek: Deep Space Nine
 Tales from the Crypt
 3rd Rock from the Sun
 Will & Grace
 The Young Indiana Jones Chronicles

Notes

References

External links
 The Emmy Awards, Information Please Database, Pearson PLC
 

Costume Design for a Series
Awards disestablished in 2014
Awards established in 1969
Costume design awards